Patricio Ponce de León (August 26, 1915 – February 26, 2010) was a Cuban mycologist. He was a professor at Belen School in Havana and at the University of Havana, and later a curator at the Field Museum of Natural History in Chicago, Illinois. He wrote a monograph on the worldwide species of the family Geastraceae, the earthstar fungi.  Ponce de León died in Miami, Florida.

Taxa described
Acutocapillitium 1976
Acutocapillitium portoricense 1976
Bovista cacao 1975
Geastrum furfuraceum 1968
Geastrum victorinii 1946
Morganella stercoraria 1971

Selected publications
Ponce de León P. (1968). "A revision of the Family Geastraceae". Fieldiana: Botany 31 (14): 303–352.
Ponce de León P. (1969). "A new member of Morganella". Fieldiana: Botany 32 (6): 69–71.
Ponce de León P. (1970). "Revision of the genus Vascellum (Lycoperdaceae)". Fieldiana: Botany 32 (9):109–126.
Ponce de León P. (1971). "Revision of the genus Morganella (Lycoperdaceae)." Fieldiana: Botany 34 (3):27–44.
Ponce de León P. (1975). "Notes on Calvatia (Lycoperdaceae), I". Fieldiana: Botany 38 (1):1–3.
Ponce de León P. (1976). "Acutocapillitium, a new genus in the Lycoperdaceae". Fieldiana: Botany 38 (4):23–29.
Ponce de León P. (1976). "Notes on Calvatia (Lycoperdaceae), II : Calvatia cretacea (Berk.) Lloyd, an Arctic montane plant". Fieldiana: Botany 38 (3):15–22.
Singer R, Ponce de León P. (1983). "Sister Mary Cecilia Bodman, 1905–1982". Mycologia 75 (5):932–933. 
Smith CW, Ponce de León P. (1982). "Hawaiian geastroid fungi". Mycologia 74 (5):712–717. 
Singer R, Ponce de León P, Machol RE. (1984). "(42-44) Three Proposals to Amend the Code". Taxon 33 (4):745–47.

References

1915 births
2010 deaths
Mycologists
Scientists from Chicago
Cuban emigrants to the United States